The Key Theatre is an Israeli visual children's theatre established in 1998.

History 
The Theatre is a collaboration between theatre actor Avi Zlicha, who previously played in Haifa Theatre and throughout the years specialized in physical theatre by Jacques Lecoq`s method, and Dikla Katz, a playwright and puppeteer, who wrote for Arutz HaYeladim (the Israeli "Children Channel"). Both Zlicha and Katz are graduates of Tel Aviv University, of the Theater department and the Film and TV department respectively. Combining film and theater has led to the creation of a company that employs different theatrical languages for each show.

Throughout the years, the Key Theatre has collaborated on projects with the Israeli Chamber Orchestra, the Renaissance Festival, Haifa Festival, the National Maritime Museum, the Tel-Aviv Museum of Art and many more. It is a member of ASSITEJ and UNIMA. In 2015 Dikla Katz was nominated as the official representative of UNIMA in Israel.

The Key Theatre also performs around the world. It has performed with "Baron Munchausen" in Vietnam and Kazakhstan (2012), and with "When all was Green" in Macedonia, Senegal, South Korea, Bulgaria (2014), Armenia, Italy (EXPO), Taiwan, Slovenia, Japan, Kosovo, Norway, Poland (2015), Belarus, Slovakia, Thailand, Myanmar, India, Montenegro, Croatia and Romania (2016).

Plays 
1998 - "Treasure Island" - Object Theatre based on R. L. Stevenson`s Book
2000 - "The Orange Shoe" - A Commedia dell'arte musical show
2002 - "The Boy who had no Fear" – A tale inspired by the Grimm Brothers using puppetry and paper pop-up
2005 - "Baron Munchausen" - A cabaret for two actors and puppets
2007 - "El BeBE" - Vaudeville on wheels for two actors and sock puppets
2009 - "The Gigantic Turnip" - A Toy Theatre Russian folktale
2012 - "When all was Green" - A puppetry play without words inspired by "The Giving Tree" and "The Lorax"

Awards 
All awards are for "When All was Green":
 Best Music Award in Children`s Theatre by ASSITEJ Israel 2013
 "Golden Dolphin" Award for worthy debuting - The IPF Golden Dolphin Festival, Varna, Bulgaria 2014
 Children`s Jury Award - International Puppet Theatres Festival, Katowice, Poland 2015
 Children`s Jury Award - VIRVAR International Puppet Festival, Kosice, Slovakia 2016
 Grand Prix Award and Dramaturgy Award - Medunarodni Festival Lutkarstva, Podgorica, Montenegro 2016
 "Tibor Sekelj" Award for the production with the most humane message - The 49th PIF Festival, Zagreb, Croatia 2016
 Original Structure for the Poetic World Award – Tandarica Festival, Bucharest, Romania 2016

External links 

 The Key Theatre website
 The Key Theatre channel on YouTube
 The Key Theatre on Facebook
 The Key Theatre on Instagram
 Dikla Katz, at the Playwrights Database
 Boutique children's theater celebrates 10 years, The Jerusalem Post, 12.5.2007
 Dikla Katz in an interview to the Vietnamese TV channel NetViet – VTC 10, on YouTube, 17.9.12
 !CultureBuzz Converses with the key people behind The Key Theatre – about "When all was Green", on YouTube, 2012
 When All Was Green — An Israeli Puppetry Play in STU, Shantou University

References 

Theatre companies in Israel
Puppet troupes
Children's theatre
1998 establishments in Israel